The Grey Line (Line 9) is a line of the Delhi Metro that connects Dwarka to Dhansa Bus Stand located in Najafgarh in the western part of Delhi, India.

The line has a single interchange to the rest of the Delhi Metro network at Dwarka station, connecting to the Blue Line. Grey Line uses standard gauge track, while the Blue Line was built with wider  broad gauge tracks.

The line uses the same rolling stock used on Pink and Magenta lines, although no Platform Screen Doors (PSDs) have been installed due to low ridership projections.

The Dwarka Station is the only station in the network to have five platforms on the same level (2 are for the Blue Line, 2 for the Grey Line, and the third one connects the Blue Line with the Najafgarh Depot).

History 
The Dwarka to Najafgarh section was opened to the public on 4 October 2019. A further extension to Dhansa Bus Stand was scheduled to open in December 2020, but construction was delayed by the COVID-19 pandemic. The extension was eventually inaugurated on 18 September 2021.

Stations 

The stations for the Grey Line are:

Najafgarh station was initially planned in the regular rectangle shape. However, when the construction work began on-ground, some of the private land could not be acquired for the project. Due to this, Delhi metro had no other option but to plan the metro station with the land which was available to them. The dumbbell shaped station has been completed in such a way that the station area has shrunk by a few metres in the middle.

Train info

References

Delhi Metro lines
Railway lines opened in 2019
2019 establishments in Delhi